Alex Marshall (born 1945) is an English actress and director, who was most active from the 1960s to the 1980s.

She has acted and directed mostly on television, but has worked on stage in both careers.

Work
Beginning her career as an actress, Marshall had many roles in theatre and television productions. In 1966 she appeared on stage as Audrey Johnson in Countercrime, a play directed by Hugh Goldie, a production later recorded for television. From 1969 to 1974 she was a storyteller for BBC Television’s Jackanory. In 1970, she appeared on stage again, in Keep Out, Love in Progress by Walter Hall, taking the lead, opposite Robert Gillespie.

In the BBC serial of Jude the Obscure (1971), Marshall took the leading role of Arabella Donn, a pig-keeper’s daughter who seduces and marries Jude. Reviewing the production in Life, John Leonard found that “Alex Marshall as Arabella steals the series”.

Marshall abandoned her acting career in 1974, having made more than three hundred appearances on television over the previous ten years, to become a television director. She commented to Des Wilson, for an article in The Observer, that her income had arrived at £5,000 a year, but she was disillusioned. She explained: 

In 1976, Marshall was researcher and script editor for Granada Television’s Crown Court and later went on to direct episodes of the show. In 1978 she directed Empire Road, a BBC Two weekly serial, and other directing work included episodes of Jackanory Playhouse,<ref name=griselda>[http://m.sms.cz/serial/jackanory-playhouse-princess-griselda-s-birthday-gift Jackanory Playhouse: Princess Griselda’s Birthday Gift (1978)] at sms.cz, accessed 9 January 2019</ref> ITV Playhouse, BBC2 Play of the Week, and Play for Today. In his memoirs, the actor Norman Beaton recalled Marshall from their time together on Empire Road: “An attractive blonde, she had a disarming smile which concealed a will of iron.”

In 1989, Marshall directed a London stage production of Peter King's The Health Farm.

Television appearancesZ-Cars: The Whizzers (1963) as StenographerCrossroads (1965) as Christine Fuller Dixon of Dock Green: The Hunt for June Fletcher (1966) as Girl in clubITV Playhouse: Countercrime (1968) as Audrey JohnsonITV Sunday Night Theatre: Better Dead (1969) as MollieJackanory (1969–1974) as StorytellerMorning Story (1970) as Mrs AllanWhom God Hath Joined (1970) as Renee SouchonJude the Obscure (1971) as Arabella DonnBudgie: Brief Encounter (1971) as FionaCoronation Street (Yvonne Chappell, 11 episodes, 1971)On the Buses (1971) as BerylPlay for Today The House on Highbury Hill (1972) as MarigoldNew Scotland Yard (1972) as Denise WrightThirty-Minute Theatre Attocity (1973) as Miss MilesThen and Now: Tigers Are Better Looking (1973) as Heather

Television as directorJackanory Playhouse: Princess Griselda’s Birthday Gift (1978)Crown Court (1978–1979)Empire Road, weekly serial, 1978BBC2 Play of the Week: The Turkey Who Lives on the Hill (1978)ITV Playhouse (1980)Play for Today'' (1982)

Notes

External links
Alex Marshall at IMDb as actress
Alex Marshall at IMDb as director
Alex Marshall at aveleyman.com

1945 births
English stage actresses
English television actresses
English television directors
English soap opera actresses
Living people
British women television directors